Jamie O'Brien Skeen (born May 2, 1988) is an American professional basketball player for Leuven Bears of the Pro Basketball League.

College career
Between 2006 and 2008, Skeen played college basketball for Wake Forest. Skeen was declared ineligible for the fall semester of the 2008–09 season for violating the school's academic policy. He informed the team in early December 2008 he would not appeal for reinstatement to the university, and subsequently transferred to VCU. As a senior at VCU in 2010–11, Skeen earned second-team All-CAA, CAA All-Tournament Team, and NABC Division I All-District 10 First Team honors. He also helped the Rams reach the Final Four of the 2011 NCAA tournament. In 39 games as a senior, he averaged 15.7 points and 7.3 rebounds per game.

Professional career
Skeen split the 2011–12 season in France (ASVEL) and Israel (Ironi Ashkelon), before playing for the Chicago Bulls during the 2012 NBA Summer League. He returned to the Israel for the 2013–14 season, joining Maccabi Ashdod. After a stint with the Charlotte Bobcats during the 2013 NBA Summer League, Skeen spent the 2013–14 season in Italy with Sutor Montegranaro. After a stint in Puerto Rico with Caciques de Humacao, he played for the Charlotte Hornets during the 2014 NBA Summer League. He then spent the 2014–15 season in Belgium with Belfius Mons-Hainaut.

After sitting out the 2015–16 season, Skeen's first stint back was with the Greensboro Swarm of the NBA Development League during the 2016 preseason. In December 2016, he moved to Kosovo to play for KB Peja.

On July 26, 2017, Skeen signed a two-year deal with Serbian club Partizan. The next month he arrived in Belgrade and did not pass the medical examinations, so the contract was terminated on August 18, 2017. On September 7, 2017, he signed with the Finnish club Kouvot for the 2017–18 Korisliiga season.

In May 2018, Skeen joined the Hawke's Bay Hawks for the 2018 New Zealand NBL season.

For the 2018–19 season, Skeen joined Salon Vilpas Vikings of the Finnish Korisliiga.

On September 3, 2019, he has signed with Leuven Bears of the Pro Basketball League.

References

External links

 Jamie Skeen at espn.com
 Jamie Skeen at eurobasket.com
 Jamie Skeen at lnb.fr 
 Jamie Skeen at legabasket.it
 Jamie Skeen at realgm.com

1988 births
Living people
American expatriate basketball people in Belgium
American expatriate basketball people in Finland
American expatriate basketball people in France
American expatriate basketball people in Israel
American expatriate basketball people in Italy
American expatriate basketball people in Kosovo
American expatriate basketball people in New Zealand
American men's basketball players
ASVEL Basket players
Basketball players from Charlotte, North Carolina
Belfius Mons-Hainaut players
Caciques de Humacao players
Hawke's Bay Hawks players
Ironi Ashkelon players
KB Peja players
Kouvot players
Maccabi Ashdod B.C. players
Power forwards (basketball)
Sutor Basket Montegranaro players
VCU Rams men's basketball players
Wake Forest Demon Deacons men's basketball players